Donaspastus pannonicus is a moth of the family Autostichidae. It is found in Italy, Albania, Hungary and Slovakia.

References

Moths described in 1952
Donaspastus
Moths of Europe